Wyoming Highway 34 (WYO 34) is a  Wyoming state highway known as Laramie-Wheatland Road. Located in Albany and Platte counties, it spans from U.S. Routes 30 and 287 near Bosler to Interstate 25 / U.S. Route 87 in Wheatland.

Route description
Wyoming Highway 34 has its west end at US 30 / US 287 near Bosler and travels from there northeast to Wheatland by the way of Morton Pass. Nearing its end, WYO 34 intersects the southern terminus of Wyoming Highway 312, which is the former routing of WYO 34 into Wheatland. Highway 34 comes to an end at I- 25 / US 87 (Exit 73) just south of Wheatland.

Wyoming 34 follows State Control Route S-109 for its entire length.

History

Wyoming Highway 34 was formerly designated as Wyoming Highway 26 between 1926 and November 1949. The WYO 26 designation was before U.S. Route 26 was extended west across Wyoming to Wheatland where it ended at U.S. Route 87. When US 26 was designated, WYO 26 was renumbered WYO 34 to avoid confusion.

Major intersections

See also

References

External links

 Wyoming Highways 000-099
 WYO 34 - US 30/US 287 to WYO 312
 WYO 34 - WYO 312 to I-25/US 87

Transportation in Albany County, Wyoming
Transportation in Platte County, Wyoming
034